Thiruvananthapuram Pettah is a railway station for inter-city trains, located at Thiruvananthapuram, in the Indian state of Kerala. The station is operated by the Southern Railway zone of the Indian Railways. The station is only  from the Thiruvananthapuram Central station. Most incoming trains from Kollam direction (from north) halt here for the convenience of passengers in the general area and to reduce the crowd at Thiruvananthapuram Central. But very few outgoing trains to north have a halt at Pettah. It has good connectivity to the city bus services and also an auto and taxi stand. This is the nearest railway station to the Trivandrum International Airport International Terminal.

See also
 Indian Railways
 Transport in Thiruvananthapuram
 Trivandrum Central
 Kochuveli railway station
 Kazhakoottam railway station
 Pettah
 Nemom railway station

References

Thiruvananthapuram railway division
Railway stations in Thiruvananthapuram